is a railway station in the city of Inuyama, Aichi Prefecture,  Japan, operated by Meitetsu.

Lines

Station layout
The station has two opposed side platforms connected by a level crossing. The station is unattended and it has ticket machines and Manaca automated turnstiles.

Platforms

Adjacent stations

|-

Station history
The station was closed in 1944 and reopened on April 5, 1949. It was renamed on December 1, 1949. A new station building was completed in 1962. 

Until December 27, 2008, the station was also served by the Monkey Park Monorail Line. The monorail platform was on the roof of platform 2.

Passenger statistics
In fiscal 2015, the station was used by an average of 1613 passengers daily.

Surrounding area
Inuyama Castle
 Meitetsu Inuyama Hotel

See also
 List of Railway Stations in Japan

References

External links

 Official web page 

Railway stations in Japan opened in 1926
Railway stations in Aichi Prefecture
Stations of Nagoya Railroad
Inuyama, Aichi